Commuter Security Group (CSG) is a Swedish security guard company, with its headquarters in Kista, Stockholm. Their main task is prevent graffiti on commuter trains and subway stations. They are also responsible for patrolling and protecting most of the major train depots. In later years they have also expanded to provide security officers who focus on security in the public transportation in Stockholm.

They were founded in November 2003 under the name CIP Security and have since then expanded rapidly. The company belongs to the Keolis conglomerate.

See also
 Public transport in Stockholm

External links
 Commuter Security Group

Companies based in Stockholm
Security companies of Sweden